Rajeev Kumar Singh is an Indian politician and a member of 17th Legislative Assembly, Uttar Pradesh of India. He represents the ‘Dataganj’ constituency in Badaun district of Uttar Pradesh.

Career

Uttar Pradesh Legislative Assembly
Rajeev Kumar Singh contested 2017 Uttar Pradesh Legislative Assembly election as Bharatiya Janata Party candidate and defeated his close contestant Sinod Kumar Shakya from Bahujan Samaj Party with a margin of 25,759 votes. He was a member of the 17th Legislative Assembly of Uttar Pradesh between 2017 and 2022.

References

Year of birth missing (living people)
Living people
Bharatiya Janata Party politicians from Uttar Pradesh
Uttar Pradesh MLAs 2017–2022
Uttar Pradesh MLAs 2022–2027